was a Japanese professional sumo wrestler from Kurayoshi, Tottori. He was the sport's 53rd yokozuna. He made his professional debut in 1959, reaching the top division in 1963. After several years at the second highest rank of ōzeki, in 1973 he was promoted to yokozuna at the age of thirty-two years two months, becoming the oldest wrestler to be promoted to yokozuna since 1958, when the current six tournaments system was established.  After his retirement he was head coach of Sadogatake stable and produced a string of top division wrestlers.

Career
Born , he came from a sumo background, as his father was involved in organising regional amateur sumo tournaments and his grandfather's brother had been a professional rikishi. The young Kamatani at first competed in judo, achieving shodan level while still in middle school. However, after doing well in a national high school sumo competition he decided on a career in professional sumo. Initially his parents wanted him to continue with judo but they were persuaded by former komusubi Kotonishiki Noboru to let him join Sadogatake stable.

Kotozakura made his professional debut in January 1959. He reached the jūryō division in July 1962 and the top makuuchi division in March 1963. After making his san'yaku debut at komusubi in January 1964 he suffered an injury and returned to jūryō, but he quickly recovered. After an 11–4 record at sekiwake in September 1967 he was awarded the Outstanding Performance prize and promotion to ōzeki. He won two tournament championships in July 1968 and March 1969, but by the early 1970s he had begun to be regarded as something of a "perpetual ōzeki", often struggling with injuries and finding it difficult to come up with the necessary wins to maintain his rank. He was kadoban, or in danger of demotion from ōzeki, three times during this period. Remarkably however, he won consecutive championships in November 1972 and January 1973 to earn promotion to yokozuna at the age of thirty two, after thirty two tournaments at ōzeki. In July 1973 he defeated Kitanofuji in a playoff to win his only championship as a yokozuna. After injuring his knee in 1974 he withdrew from several tournaments and announced his retirement that July.

He made an appearance in the 1967 James Bond film You Only Live Twice, seen fighting Fujinishiki.

After retirement
 
Kotozakura had been expecting to open up his own training stable, but when his stablemaster died suddenly just days after Kotozakura's retirement, he took over Sadogatake stable instead. He produced many top division wrestlers over the years, such as ōzeki Kotokaze, Kotoōshū, Kotomitsuki and Kotoshōgiku and sekiwake Kotogaume, Kotofuji, Kotonishiki, and Kotonowaka. When yokozuna Asashōryū was criticized for his behaviour in 2003, Kotozakura defended the Mongolian by pointing out the lack of emotional strength in young Japanese sumo wrestlers at the time. After 31 years as head coach, he passed on ownership of the stable upon reaching the mandatory retirement age of sixty five in November 2005 to Kotonowaka, who had become his son-in-law. Shortly after attending the ōzeki promotion ceremony of Kotomitsuki, Kotozakura died on August 14, 2007. He had battled diabetes for several years and had also suffered the trauma of a leg amputation.

Fighting style
Kotozakura was known for his bull-like rushing style of sumo, earning him the nickname . His favoured techniques were the two most common kimarite in sumo – yorikiri (force out) and oshidashi (push out). When grabbing his opponent's mawashi he preferred a migi-yotsu, or left hand outside, right hand inside grip.

Career record

See also
Glossary of sumo terms
List of past sumo wrestlers
List of sumo tournament top division champions
List of sumo tournament top division runners-up
List of sumo tournament second division champions
List of yokozuna

References

External links

Japan Sumo Association profile
Memorial Museum at Kurayoshi City's official website
Article on Kotozakura

1940 births
2007 deaths
Deaths from diabetes
Japanese sumo wrestlers
Sumo people from Tottori Prefecture
Yokozuna
Sadogatake stable sumo wrestlers